HTMS Bangpakong (FFG-456) is the second ship of  of the Royal Thai Navy, a variant of the Chinese-built Type 053H2 frigate.

Design and description 
Bangpakong has a complement of 168 personnel, including 22 officers.

As a Type 053HT frigate, the ship are armed with two 100 mm/56 Type 79 twin-barreled guns and four 37 mm Type 76 twin-barreled guns. For anti-submarine warfare, the ship is equipped with two Type 86 anti-submarine rocket launchers and two BMB depth charge racks. For surface warfare, Bangpakong is equipped with eight C-801 anti-ship missile launchers.

In August 2020, Royal Thai Navy planned to modernizes Bangpakong and Chao Phraya to have similar capabilities to a modern offshore patrol vessel. The planned upgrade includes replacing the 100 mm guns with 76/62 automatic guns and all four 37 mm guns with a rapid-fire 30 mm autocannon, along with new combat management systems and surveillance systems.

Construction and career 
The four ships of the class was ordered on 18 July 1988. Bangpakong was laid down in April 1989 at Hudong Shipyard, Shanghai. The ship was launched on 25 July 1990 and was commissioned on 20 July 1991. Upon the ship completion and arrival on Thailand, the shipbuilding quality were deemed to be unsatisfactory and works was needed to improve the ship. The damage control abilities were also upgraded before she entered service.

Upon entering service, Bangpakong and her sisters were frequently used for training and rotated monthly to the Coast Guard.

Bangpakong and  attended a fleet review off the coast of Qingdao on 23 April 2019 on the occasion of 70th Anniversary of the People's Liberation Army Navy.

References

Printed sources 
 
 
 

Ships built in China
1990 ships
Chao Phraya-class frigates